Sedenia leucogramma is a moth in the family Crambidae. It is found in Australia.

References

Moths described in 1937
Spilomelinae